Agononida pilosimanus is a species of squat lobster in the family Munididae. The males measure  on average and the females  on average.

References

Squat lobsters
Crustaceans described in 1969